Coastal sun orchid may refer to the Australian orchid species:
 Thelymitra granitora
 Thelymitra improcera